Frederick Jeremiah Edwards  (3 October 1894 – 9 March 1964) was an Irish recipient of the Victoria Cross, the highest and most prestigious award for gallantry in the face of the enemy that can be awarded to British and Commonwealth forces.

Biography
Edwards was born in Queenstown (now named Cobh), County Cork, Ireland. As a boy he attended the Royal Hibernian Military School in Dublin. He was 21 years old, and a private in the 12th Battalion, The Middlesex Regiment (Duke of Cambridge's Own), British Army during the First World War, and was awarded the VC for his deeds on 26 September 1916 in the Battle of Thiepval Ridge at Thiepval, France:
part of the line was held up by machine-gun fire and all the officers had become casualties. There was confusion and indication of retirement. Private Edwards, grasping the situation and on his own initiative, dashed out towards the gun, which he knocked out with his bombs. This very gallant act, coupled with great presence of mind and disregard of personal danger, made further advance possible and cleared up a dangerous situation.

He was later promoted to corporal and after leaving the British Army he was forced to sell his medal to make ends meet. He died on 9 March 1964 at the Royal Star and Garter Home in Richmond (then in Surrey, now in London) and is buried in Richmond Cemetery.

His Victoria Cross is displayed at the National Army Museum, Chelsea, England.

In popular culture
Edwards was portrayed by Adam Webb in the 2006 BBC docudrama The Somme – From Defeat to Victory, a film made to commemorate the 90th anniversary of the Battle of the Somme.

References

Sources

Listed in order of publication year 
The Register of the Victoria Cross (1981, 1988 and 1997)

Ireland's VCs  (Department of Economic Development, 1995)

External links
Stewart, Iain (23 November 2004. Grave location for holders of the Victoria Cross in the county of Surrey, www.victoriacross.org.uk. Retrieved 13 October 2021.
Lives of the First World War: Frederick Jeremiah Edwards, Imperial War Museums. Retrieved 13 October 2021.

1894 births
1964 deaths
British Army personnel of World War I
British Army recipients of the Victoria Cross
Burials at Richmond Cemetery
Irish Battle of the Somme recipients of the Victoria Cross
Irish emigrants to the United Kingdom
Irish soldiers in the British Army
Middlesex Regiment soldiers
Soldiers from Cobh
Military personnel from County Cork